Johanna Ölander (23 May 1827 – 16 July 1909, Hedvig Eleonora Parish, Stockholm, Sweden) was a Swedish song composer. She wrote the tune for the Christmas song Julpolska ("Nu ha vi ljus, här i vårt hus").

She was married to Per August Ölander.

References 

1827 births
1909 deaths
Swedish composers
Swedish women composers
19th-century Swedish women musicians